Sven Gustav Andersson (August 21, 1921 – May 3, 2016) was a Swedish speed skater who competed at the 1956 Winter Olympics in Cortina d'Ampezzo. Participating in two events, he finished 22nd in a field of 46 competitors in the men's 5000 metres and 13th out of 32 skaters in the men's 10,000 metres. He was born in Karlskoga and competed out of Bofors Cykelklubb.

References

1921 births
2016 deaths
Swedish male speed skaters
Olympic speed skaters of Sweden
Speed skaters at the 1956 Winter Olympics
People from Karlskoga Municipality
Sportspeople from Örebro County
20th-century Swedish people
Burials at Skogskyrkogården (Karlskoga)